Artur Kuznetsov (born 9 March 1995) is a Ukrainian football defender. He plays for Ukrainian side Metalurh Zaporizhya.

Career
Kuznetsov is a product of youth team system FC Metalurh Zaporizhya. His first trainer was Oleksandr Rudyka.

He made his debut for FC Metalurh in the main-squad playing against FC Dnipro Dnipropetrovsk on 15 March 2015 in the Ukrainian Premier League.

In January 2016, he signed a contract with another Ukrainian Premier League side FC Chornomorets Odesa.

References

External links
Profile at FFU Official Site (Ukr)

1995 births
FC Chornomorets Odesa players
FC Metalurh Zaporizhzhia players
Living people
Ukraine youth international footballers
Ukrainian footballers
Ukrainian Premier League players

Association football defenders